Dora Maldonado (born 9 November 1970) is a Honduran judoka. She competed in the women's extra-lightweight event at the 1996 Summer Olympics.

References

External links
 

1970 births
Living people
Honduran female judoka
Olympic judoka of Honduras
Judoka at the 1996 Summer Olympics
Place of birth missing (living people)
Pan American Games medalists in judo
Pan American Games bronze medalists for Honduras
Medalists at the 1995 Pan American Games
Judoka at the 1995 Pan American Games